Magrs is a surname. Notable people with the surname include:

Paul Magrs (born 1969), English writer

See also
Magras